Academy of Integrated Christian Studies is a Christian college situated in Aizawl, Mizoram.   It is affiliated to the Senate of Serampore College (University) and the Baptist Church of Mizoram.

History
The school was founded in 2000 by the Baptist Church of Mizoram.

References

External links 
Official site

Seminaries and theological colleges in India
Universities and colleges in Mizoram
Baptist universities and colleges
Christian seminaries and theological colleges in India
Education in Aizawl
Seminaries and theological colleges affiliated to the Senate of Serampore College (University)
Educational institutions established in 2000
2000 establishments in Mizoram